Almahalla Sports Club is a Libyan football club based in Tripoli, Libya. The club won two Libyan Premier League titles in a successful period in the late 1990s. The club finished 2nd in 1997, and followed this with two back-to-back titles, in seasons 1997–98 and 1998–99. The club's home strip is orange, and the away strip is black.

Glory Years: Late 1990s
During the late 1990s, Almahalla started to build a strong team. They got considerably stronger as the decade, and obtained a mid-table finish in the 1996–97 season. Just one season later, the club, barely 20 years old, and recently promoted, won the title, giving them a place in the 1999 CAF Champions League. They defeated the Chadian champions AS Coton Chad 3–2 in the preliminary round, losing the first leg away in N'Djamena 2–0 on January 31, 1999. However, two weeks later, they won 3–0 in the second leg in Tripoli to set up a First Round tie with eventual finalists ES Tunis. The first leg at the 11 June Stadium was a tense affair, with the Tunisian side winning 2–1. Two weeks later they lost 2–0 at Stade El Menzah, as they bowed out of the competition 4–1 on aggregate.

However, the 1998–99 season proved to be just as fruitful domestically. Al Mahallah won the league title again, and thus secured qualification to the 2000 CAF Cup, where they met the Egyptian club and eventual runners-up Ismaily. Ismaily ran out 5–1 victors at the Ismailia Stadium, but Al Mahallah salvaged pride in the second leg, as they won 3–2. This was Ismaily's only defeat in the competition.

Almahalla participated in the CAF Cup again in the 2001 edition of the competition, where they met the Senegalese outfit ASEC Ndiambour. Mahallah won the first leg 2–1, but later lost 2–0 in Louga, going out 3–2 on aggregate.

Relegation and Stagnation
The club was relegated from the Libyan Premier League in the 2001–02 season, and has failed to come anywhere near that level since. The club was even relegated to the Libyan Third Division, and has only recently returned to the second tier. In the 2006–07 season, their first back in the Second Division, the club finished 9th in Group A, avoiding relegation by 6 points; last season, they made a great improvement, and finished 5th in Group B. They have made a great start to this season's competition, winning five of their first 6 matches. As of the end of Round 7, they sit top of Group A, with 19 points from 7 games.

Honours
Libyan Premier League: 2
Champion : 1998, 1999
Libyan SuperCup: 1
Winner : 1998

Performance in CAF competitions
CAF Champions League:
1999 – First Round

CAF Cup: 2 appearances
2000 – First Round
2001 – First Round

References

Mahalah
1977 establishments in Libya